

Season summary
The 2007–08 Victoria Salmon Kings season is the Salmon Kings' 4th season in the ECHL.  The season saw the Salmon Kings establish themselves in the ECHL with a 91-point season, and winning 42 of 72 games. Before the start of the season, the Salmon Kings signed players Ash Goldie, Kevin Estrada, Gary Gladue, and goaltender Billy Thompson to complement their returning star players Wes Goldie, Milan Gajic, Kiel McLeod, and Ryan Wade.  With their new additions and returning players the Salmon Kings became an elite team in the 2007-08 season, going 15-5-0-0 through their first 20 games and continued to earn wins going into the ECHL All-Star Game. At the 2008 All-Star Game festivities in Stockton, Ash Goldie showed his impressive skills during the two-day event.  At the skills competition, Goldie became the first player in the ECHL to go 5 for 5 in the target shooting event.  The following night at the All-Star Game, Goldie scored an All-Star record 6 points, recording 3 goals and 3 assists to earn All-Star M.V.P. honours. After the All-Star game, the Salmon Kings struggled after going through numerous injuries and call ups, but managed to narrowly win the National West division title, and took the number two seed into the Kelly Cup playoffs. In the playoffs, the Salmon Kings won their first-ever playoff round by eliminating the Bakersfield Condors in six games. Unfortunately in the second round, the Salmon Kings were eliminated from the playoffs by the Utah Grizzlies in five games. In their West Division title season, the Salmon Kings were led offensively by the Goldie brothers. Ash Goldie finished fourth in league scoring with 83 points, second in goals with 40, and first in power play goals with 20, while his brother, Wes led the league with 42 goals and 6 shorthanded goals.

Standings

Division standings

Conference standings

Schedule and results

Regular season

Playoffs

Player stats

Skaters

Note: GP = Games played; G = Goals; A = Assists; Pts = Points; +/- = Plus/minus; PIM = Penalty minutes

Goaltenders
Note: GP = Games played; TOI = Time on ice (minutes); W = Wins; L = Losses; OT = Overtime losses; SOL = Shootout losses; GA = Goals against; GAA= Goals against average; Sv% = Save percentage; SO= Shutouts

†Denotes player spent time with another team before joining Victoria. Stats reflect time with the Salmon Kings only. ‡Denotes player no longer with the team. Stats reflect time with Salmon Kings only.

Transactions

Trades

Free agents acquiredFree agents lost

Released Players PickupPlayers Released

 *-Suspended by Team

Professional affiliations

Vancouver Canucks
The Salmon Kings' NHL affiliate based in Vancouver, British Columbia.

Manitoba Moose
The Salmon Kings' AHL affiliate based in Winnipeg, Manitoba.

Victoria Salmon Kings seasons
Victoria
Victoria